The Dr. Oscar Owre House is a historic house located at 2625 Newton Venue South just north of Lake of the Isles in Minneapolis, Minnesota. It was designed by notable local architects Purcell, Feick & Elmslie in the Prairie School style.

Description and history 
Dr. Oscar Owre was a professor at the University of Minnesota School of Dentistry. The house is generally cube-shaped but extends outward through a series of porches. The front porch is glassed-in and provides a good view of the lake. It shares some design features with the nearby William Gray Purcell House, including the low, overhanging eaves, bands of windows, and the side entry.

Dr. Owre and his wife, Katherine, were concerned that the house would come in over its budget. William Purcell later wrote, "Oscar was scared to death that this building was going to cost him more than he could afford, and had been told by all his friends that every building operation carried on by an architect was loaded with heartbreaking extras which would spoil all his fun, if not ruin him financially." Fortunately for the Owres, the house actually came in under budget, at $17,275. The house was listed on the National Register of Historic Places on March 8, 1984.

References

Houses completed in 1912
Houses in Minneapolis
Houses on the National Register of Historic Places in Minnesota
National Register of Historic Places in Minneapolis
Prairie School architecture in Minnesota
Purcell and Elmslie buildings
1912 establishments in Minnesota